
Grabovica may refer to:

Places in Bosnia and Herzegovina 

 Grabovica, Doboj
 Grabovica, Kotor Varoš
 Grabovica, Nevesinje
 Grabovica, Olovo
 Grabovica, Tomislavgrad
 Grabovica, Vlasenica
 Grabovica, Zavidovići
 Grabovica, Žepče
 Grabovica Donja
 Grabovica Gornja

Places in Croatia 

 Grabovica, Croatia

Places in Serbia 

 Grabovica, Despotovac
 Grabovica, Gornji Milanovac
 Grabovica, Kladovo
 Grabovica, Sjenica

See also
Grabovica River (disambiguation)
Grabovac (disambiguation)